Arnór Þór Gunnarsson (born 23 October 1987) is an Icelandic handball player for Bergischer HC and the Icelandic national team.

His brother, Aron, was the captain of the Iceland national football team.

National team career
Arnór announced his retirement from the national team in December 2021 after 120 games.

References

External links

1987 births
Living people
Arnor Thor Gunnarsson
Handball-Bundesliga players
Expatriate handball players
Arnor Thor Gunnarsson
Arnor Thor Gunnarsson
Arnor Thor Gunnarsson
Bergischer HC players